FloSports is an over-the-top subscription sports broadcaster and streaming service. The company is based in Austin, Texas, United States, and was founded in 2006. FloSports streams live sporting events to audiences around the world.

History

Launch 
FloSports was founded in 2006 by Martin Floreani, Mark Floreani (collegiate athletes) and Madhu Venkatesan based in Austin, Texas. Martin designed the website’s prototype with the aim of covering collegiate sports with the same detail that ESPN gives to the NFL and NBA. The brothers raised U.S. $10,000 in seed money from friends and family and started covering wrestling and track events. Co-founder Mark captured the service’s first original broadcast, Ryan Hall’s U.S half-marathon record, from the back of a pickup truck using a handheld camera. Lo-fi footage, engine noise digital interference and fog impacted the quality of the broadcast. However, having the only footage of Hall’s record-breaking run caused a surge in the website’s popularity. By 2017 the company had 256 employees and 25 Web video channels. They changed their business model to a subscription-based service in 2012 and doubled their revenue over the following two years.

Fundraising 
The company raised $8 million in Series A and a further $21 million in Series B financing in 2016  led by DCM Ventures and Bertlesmann Digital Media Investments. By 2019, the company had grown to 250 employees and raised a further $47 million in series C.

Acquisitions 
The company acquired DirtonDirt.com, a grassroots racing streaming and content platform, in September 2019. In June 2020, FloSports purchased Speed Shift TV and acquired 400 races, with a focus on grassroots racing.

FloSports acquired TrackWrestling in early 2021, a deal that increased the number of wrestling events that will be streamed on its FloWrestling service and brought wrestling analytics to the platform. In October 2021, it was announced that FloSports had acquired HockeyTech, an ice hockey streaming platform and sports data provider.

Streaming partnerships 
FloSports announced a partnership with WWNLive in 2016 to run a streaming service dedicated to wrestling. In December 2018, FloRacing signed a broadcast agreement with the United States Auto Club for its midget and sprint car series. In May 2019, the Colonial Athletic Association selected FloSports as its lead media partner becoming the first college conference to pick a streaming OTT, direct-to-consumer company as their primary distribution platform.

FloSports became the local broadcaster for two Major League Soccer teams for the 2019 season: D.C. United and FC Cincinnati, an expansion team. The company faced technical issues during early broadcasts due to inaccurate geofencing restrictions. The organization pledged a full refund, and offered the club's season ticket holders a discount on its annual subscription fees. FloSports promised additional soccer broadcasts and shoulder programming to justify its subscription fee that largely never materialized. D.C. United and Flosports ended their four-year contract prematurely in October 2019. D.C. United opted to stream its final regular season match on its website for free. FC Cincinnati announced its matches would no longer be available through FloSports in June 2020. 

In January 2020, NASCAR Hall of Fame inductee and motorsports legend, Tony Stewart, awarded streaming rights to the Eldora Speedway and All Star Circuit of Champions to FloSports. In the Spring 2020, FloSports launched FloBaseball. Later in 2020, the company signed a multi-year partnership with ECHL to broadcast professional hockey starting with the 2021 season. 

FloSports expanded its wrestling offering through a partnership with United World Wrestling, the global governing body for the sport, in late 2020. 

In 2021, USA Cycling signed a 3 year broadcast partnership with FloSports. FloSports will also be the NGB's (national governing body's) official sponsor. The Unbound Gravel race, a cycling race covering various distances, has never been broadcast before due to remote locations and rough terrain. FloSports became the first to broadcast the race in June 2021 and will stream the race again in 2022. FloSports signed a multi-year streaming deal with USA Gymnastics, the national governing body for gymnastics, in 2021.

In late 2021, NASCAR announced a partnership to stream its grassroots racing series on FloRacing starting in 2022. Series that will be broadcast on FloRacing includes the ARCA Menards Series, ARCA Menards Series West, ARCA Menards Series East, NASCAR Whelen Modified Tour, and NASCAR Pinty's Series and NASCAR Weekly Series. Several tracks on the Modified and Weekly Series had been broadcasting on the service prior to the announcement (Eldora, Oswego, Stafford). Over 280 NASCAR grassroots events were anticipated to be broadcast in 2022 (out of a total of approximately 2000 total events broadcast on the service).

Technology 
In 2019, the company introduced apps for Android and smart TV apps. In October 2019, FloSports rebranded, and expanded its distribution with the release of an Android app.

In 2020, FloSports began working on a Watch Party feature for their apps that would allow fans to watch events together, virtually.

Programming

FloSports streams live and on-demand events for over 25 different sports categories.

Network Sites

 FloBikes - Cycling
 FloBowling - Bowling
 FloCheer - All Star Cheer & Dance
 FloCombat - MMA
 FloDance - Dance
 FloElite - Elite Fitness
 FloFC - Soccer
 FloFootball - Football
 FloGrappling - Grappling
 FloGymnastics - Gymnastics
 FloHockey - Hockey
 FloHoops - Basketball
 FloLive - New and Miscellaneous
 FloMarching - Marching Arts
 FloRacing - Motorsports
 FloRodeo - Rodeo
 FloRugby - Rugby
 FloSoftball - Softball
 FloSwimming - Swimming
 FloTrack - Track and Field
 FloVoice - Singing
 FloVolleyball - Volleyball
 FloWrestling - Wrestling
 Varsity - Varsity TV

Sports

Baseball 
 Big Ten
 Colonial Athletic Association
 Future Star Series Nationals 17s
 Future Star Series Nationals 16s
 Future Star Series Nationals 15s
 NB Future Stars Series
 College Baseball Classic

Basketball 
 Basketball Bundesliga
 Big Ten
Colonial Athletic Association
 EuroLeague
 EuroCup
 FIBA 3x3 World Tour

Bowling 
 PBA
 PBA50
 PBA Senior
 USBC
 World Bowling Tour

Combat

Competitive Fitness

Cycling 
 Cycling Canada
 Giro d'Italia
 Tour de France (Canada Only)
 Union Europeenne De Cyclisme
 Union Cyclste Internationale

Football 
 Colonial Athletic Association
 FCS Bowl
 National Bowl
 All American Classic
 Dream Bowl
 Tropical Bowl
 HBCU Spirit of America Bowl
 Mid-Eastern Athletic Conference
 Southern Intercollegiate Athletic Conference
 South Atlantic Conference

Rodeo 
 Canadian Finals Rodeo
 PBR
 RidePass

Rugby 
 United Rugby Championship
 Top14
 Rugby Sevens
 Premiership Rugby
 Super Rugby Pacific
 USA Rugby
 England Rugby
 National Provisional Championship (New Zealand)
 Autumn Nations Series
 European Rugby Champions Cup (EPCR)
 EPCR Challenge Cup

Grappling 
 ADCC Submission Wrestling World Championship
 Fight To Win
 IBJJF
 Who’s Number One

Gymnastics

Hockey 
 Big Ten
 WCHA
 Atlantic Hockey
 ECHL

Lacrosse 
 Big Ten
 Snowbird Baseball
 Frisco Classic
 Future Star Series

Marching 
 Drum Corps International
 Bands of America
 Winter Guard International

Motorsports 
 All Star Circuit of Champions
 ARCA Menards Series (Select Events with MAVTV)
 ARCA Menards Series East and West
 Chili Bowl Nationals
 Eldora Speedway (Outside of World of Outlaws Events)
 FIA World Rallycross Championship
 Lucas Oil ASCS National Tour
 IRA Outlaw Sprints
 NARC King of the West 410 Sprints
 NASCAR Advance Auto Parts Weekly Series (Events held mostly at Bowman Gray Stadium, New Smyrna Speedway, and Berlin Raceway)
 NASCAR Pinty's Series
 NASCAR Whelen Modified Tour
 Pennsylvania Speed Week
 Super DIRTcar Series
 USAC including Sprint, Silver Crown, and Midget events such as Indiana Midget Week, Indiana Sprint Week, Pennsylvania Midget Week, Oval Nationals, and Turkey Night Grand Prix.

Softball 
 Big Ten
 PGF
 Judi Carman Classic

Soccer 
 CONCACAF (select matches)
 Supercoppa Italiana and Coppa Italia (Canada only)
 NCAA
 CNL League A
 CNL League B
 CNL League C

Swimming 
 Big Ten
 Big 12
 ISCA
 LEN European Aquatics
 USA Water Polo

Track 
 Big Ten
 Big 12
 NCAA
 AAU 
 MileSplit
 Under Armour Sunset Tour
 Amsterdam Marathon
 London Marathon
 Marathon De Paris
 Stumptown Twilight
 Great Manchester Run
 Great North Run

Volleyball 
 Big Ten
 Big 12
 Colonial Athletic Association
 FIV3
 Panamerican Cup
 Nike Tournament of Championship
 NCAA

Wrestling 
 Big Ten
 NCAA
 Fight To Win
 Actec Warrior Championship

Controversy
In 2022, a class action lawsuit was filed against FloSports in New York federal court due to their alleged business practices. The suit claimed that FloSports ‘misleads customers into believing they are only being charged a monthly fee — rather than the full annual fee — when they first sign up for the sports streaming service.’

References

External links

Internet television channels
Sports television in the United States
Sports television networks in the United States
Subscription video streaming services
Internet properties established in 2006
Internet technology companies of the United States